The Missouri Department of Conservation (MDC) and the Missouri Conservation Commission were created by Article IV Sections 40-42 of the Missouri Constitution, which were adopted by the voters of the state in 1936 as Amendment 4 to the constitution. The Commission is vested with control, management, restoration, conservation, and regulation of fish, forest, and wildlife resources of the state.
The Department of Conservation owns and oversees hatcheries, sanctuaries, refuges, and reservations, and enforces the state wildlife code.  The Commission consists of four individuals appointed by the Governor of Missouri to serve unpaid 6-year terms. No more than two of the individuals may be from the same political party.

Leadership 
As of 2020, the ninth and current director of the Department of Conservation is Sara Parker Pauley.

Publications
The department publishes the Missouri Conservationist, a monthly periodical that is free to all residents of the state of Missouri.

Conservation areas

The MDC administers hundreds of parcels of land in all counties of the state. Most areas are owned by the department, but some are leased to the department, and some areas are leased by the department to other entities for management.

The department only acquires land from willing sellers and compensates local taxing authorities for the loss of property taxes.

The department has divided the counties of the state into eight administrative regions for the purpose of managing these lands and providing conservation services to the citizens of the state.

See also
List of law enforcement agencies in Missouri
List of state and territorial fish and wildlife management agencies in the United States

References

External links

 (1944) Final Report: Federal Aid - Wildlife Program typed, bound publication, including maps, tables, and photographs - digital facsimile from the Linda Hall Library
Publications by or about Missouri Department of Conservation at Internet Archive.

Environment of Missouri
Conservation, Department of
State environmental protection agencies of the United States
1936 establishments in Missouri